Memorial Gymnasium is a 2,500-seat multi-purpose arena in Charlottesville, Virginia.  It opened in 1924.  It replaced Fayerweather Gymnasium as home to the University of Virginia Cavaliers basketball team until University Hall opened in 1965.

History
Established originally as a memorial to the University's World War I casualties, the facility continues to play a role in the athletic, recreational and physical education-kinesiology programs at the school. The classes of 1920 and 1921 pledged a collected total of $142,000 in support of the gymnasium as a memorial and construction was completed in 1924. From its completion, the gymnasium housed a variety of sporting and social activities, including basketball, boxing and dances. The basketball program was housed in the building for 42 seasons before University Hall opened in 1965. It was also the past home of the swimming and dive teams and indoor track teams. After renovations, the building - now used extensively by the University's intramural programs - also serves as the home arena for the Cavaliers' wrestling and women's volleyball teams.

Memorial Gym was the site of President Franklin D. Roosevelt's "Stab in the Back" speech on June 10, 1940, when, in the middle of giving his commencement address to the graduating class, he was informed of the alliance between Italy and Nazi Germany.

Current usage
Currently, Memorial Gymnasium, commonly known as Mem Gym to Virginia students, hosts the school wrestling and volleyball teams, and is also used by the school as an intramural sports venue. The building includes a small weight room, including cardiovascular machines, and boxing practice facilities, as well as an indoor wooden jogging track on the second floor that rings around and overlooks the basketball courts on the first floor. The swimming pool was also primarily used prior to the construction of the Aquatic and Fitness Center. The swimming pool was finally closed in 2007 and converted into an indoor soccer ground.

Recent renovations
An anonymous gift of $845,500 provided for extensive improvements to the building.

See also
 Virginia Cavaliers

References

External links
 Memorial Gym at VirginiaSports.com
 Memorial Gym at Virginia.edu

Virginia Cavaliers basketball venues
Basketball venues in Virginia
Boxing venues in the United States
Defunct college basketball venues in the United States
College volleyball venues in the United States
College wrestling venues in the United States
Indoor soccer venues in the United States
Indoor track and field venues in the United States
Swimming venues in the United States
Event venues on the National Register of Historic Places in Virginia
National Register of Historic Places in Charlottesville, Virginia
Buildings and structures completed in 1924
Buildings of the University of Virginia
1924 establishments in Virginia
Sports venues on the National Register of Historic Places